George Washington Batchelder (February 18, 1826 – January 9, 1910) was an American politician who served in the Minnesota Senate for several years from 1869 to 1874.

Batchelder was born in Danville, Vermont to John and Alice Batchelder. He studied at the University of Vermont beginning in 1847. In 1851 he earned his A.B. degree and then proceeded to earn an A.M. degree. He was admitted to the bar in Tennessee in 1854, but he first practiced law in Janesville, Wisconsin. He arrived in Minnesota in 1855 and settled in Faribault, where he continued his legal practice. His partners in law included John M. Berry and Thomas S. Buckham.

Batchelder began his political career with unsuccessful candidacies for District Judge in 1865 and for United States Congress in 1867. Despite these failures, he was elected as a Republican in 1868 to the Minnesota Senate, where he served from January 5, 1869 to January 2, 1871. He served another term from January 5, 1872 to January 2, 1874, this time under the Democratic ticket. After his time in the state government, he became more involved in Faribault's municipal government, serving on the Board of Education from 1877 to 1892 and serving as mayor in 1880 and 1881.

He died in Faribault on January 9, 1910.

References

1826 births
1910 deaths
Minnesota state senators
People from Danville, Vermont
University of Vermont alumni
Wisconsin lawyers
Minnesota lawyers
Minnesota Republicans
Minnesota Democrats
19th-century American politicians
School board members in Minnesota
Mayors of places in Minnesota